Take as Needed for Pain is the second studio album by American sludge metal band Eyehategod, released on November 22, 1993. It was reissued in 2006 as part of Century Media's 20th Anniversary series of reissues, with six bonus tracks, taken from rare 7-inch records and splits.

Background and recording
After being signed to Century Media in the early 1990s, the band began to self-record and produce their first album for the label, and second album total, in Studio 13. Studio 13 was a small recording studio located on the 13th floor of an abandoned department store located in New Orleans, about a few minutes away from where Mike Williams was living.

Reception

Take as Needed for Pain has received praise since its 1993 release, and is considered by many as one of the band's best albums. According to Mike IX Williams, it was the favorite album of nearly all band members, and his favorite album title, with the exception of Poison Idea's Record Collectors Are Pretentious Assholes

In 2009, the album was chosen as the number 1 sludge album by Terrorizer. The magazine commented: 

In 2013, the song "White Nigger" was officially retitled "White Neighbor" during a rehearsal with Melvins drummer Dale Crover.

In 2016, Metal Hammer named the album in their list "The 10 Essential Sludge Albums", stating the album "raised the bar". In 2017, Rolling Stone listed the album at No. 92 on its list of The 100 Greatest Metal Albums of All Time.

Track listing

Personnel
Eyehategod
 Mike IX Williams – vocals
 Brian Patton – lead guitar
 Jimmy Bower – rhythm guitar
 Mark Schultz – bass
 Joey LaCaze – drums

Production
 Robinson Mills – engineer
 Perry Cunningham – remastering
 Tom Bejgrowicz – additional layout
 Charles Elliot – reissue coordination

Release history

References

External links
 

Eyehategod albums
1993 albums
Century Media Records albums